Acyrthosiphon gossypii, the melon aphid or cotton aphid, is an aphid in the superfamily Aphidoidea in the order Hemiptera. It is a true bug and sucks sap from plants. It is found from India, Sri Lanka, Cameroon, and South Africa.

Host
Normally host in Sesbania grandiflora.

Economic importance
It is known to be a major insect pest on cotton plants and melon fruits.

References

Further reading

Macrosiphini
Agricultural pest insects
Insects of India